Kulina may refer to:

Kulina (Aleksinac), village in central Serbia
Kulina (Derventa), a village in Bosnia and Herzegovina
Kulina (Kalesija), a village in Bosnia and Herzegovina
Kulina, Estonia, village in Vinni Parish, Lääne-Viru County, Estonia
Kulina people, an indigenous people of Brazil and Peru
Kulina language

Other
Culina (disambiguation)
Kulin (disambiguation)